Vincent Denigris (1938 – August 1984) was an Argentine professional wrestler better known by his ring name Vicente Denigris or Argentina Apollo (often Vittorio Argentina Apollo). He was part of the Chicago Comiskey Park shows in 1961, teaming with Antonino Rocca, and a popular star on Studio Wrestling during the 1960s. He achieved his greatest success in WWWF where he was a 1-time WWWF United States Tagteam Champion along with Don McClaritty.

Professional career
Apollo made his debut in 1960 in northeastern territories of NWA. He made his debut against Jack Vancy on a house show in New York City under Capital Wrestling corporation. He wrestled extensively for Capital Wrestling Corporation the precursor to WWWF. His main work was for the World Wide Wrestling Federation 1963-1968 and various territories of the National Wrestling Alliance, most notably, Championship Wrestling from Florida and Georgia Championship Wrestling. 

Just a few months in his stint in the CWC, he teamed up with Johnny Valentine to win the WWWF United States Tag Team Championship from the team of the Fabulous Kangaroos(AL Costello and Roy Hefferman). But due to the confines of the time limit curfew, the title did not change hands.

He was best known for his gymnastics in the ring, performing such feats as climbing onto the ropes, performing a back aerial somersault into a roll, then using a handspring to return to his feet and to throw a savate kick to his opponent's midsection. He eventually had to retire due to injuries from his explosive wrestling style. He had his last match in 1975 when he teamed up with Luiz Martinez, to challenge the IWA world tagteam champions The Mongols (Geeto and Bolo Mongol) for the championship. Apollo and Martinez lost the match and Apollo retired shortly afterwards. He died on 2 August 1984, due to a heart attack.

Championships and accomplishments
All-South Wrestling Alliance
ASWA Georgia Tag Team Championship (1 time, first) - with Dick Steinborn
Championship Wrestling from Florida
NWA Florida Tag Team Championship (1 time) - with Jose Lothario
Mid-South Sports
NWA Georgia Tag Team Championship (1 time) - with Tommy Siegler
NWA Macon Tag Team Championship (1 time) - with Dick Steinborn
NWA Southeastern Tag Team Championship (Georgia version) (1 time) - with Roberto Soto
World Wide Wrestling Federation
WWWF United States Tag Team Championship (1 time) - with Don McLarity
World Wide Wrestling Association
WWWA Tag Team Championship (1 time) - with Bruno Sammartino

See also
 List of premature professional wrestling deaths

References

External links
 

1938 births
1984 deaths
Argentine male professional wrestlers
Sportspeople from Buenos Aires
20th-century professional wrestlers
NWA Florida Tag Team Champions
NWA Macon Tag Team Champions
NWA Georgia Tag Team Champions